is a junction passenger railway station located in the city of Chōfu, Tokyo, Japan, operated by the private railway operator Keio Corporation.

Lines 
Chōfu Station is served by the Keio Line and Keiō Sagamihara Line as the junction of the two lines. It is located 15.5 kilometers from the starting point of the Keio Line at Shinjuku Station and is a terminus of the 22.6 kilometer Sagamihara Line.

Station layout 
This station has two underground island platforms: one in the second basement (Platforms 1 and 2) and one in the third basement (Platforms 3 and 4). Ticket windows and gates are in the first basement.

Platforms

History

Recent development
Until 2012, Chofu Station was on the ground level and had busy grade crossings at either end for road traffic, while trains arriving from the Keio Sagamihara Line blocked both lines of the Keio Line as they enter the station. Keio Corporation resolved both these issues by grade separation of railway lines around the station area. Underground tracks opened on August 19, 2012.

Passenger statistics
In fiscal 2019, the station was used by an average of 130,065 passengers daily. 

The passenger figures (boarding passengers only) for previous years are as shown below.

Surrounding area
 Chōfu City Hall
 Chōfu Tenjin Shrine
 University of Electro-Communications

See also
 List of railway stations in Japan

References

External links

Keio Railway Station Information 

Railway stations in Japan opened in 1913
Keio Line
Keio Sagamihara Line
Stations of Keio Corporation
Railway stations in Tokyo
Chōfu, Tokyo